Alan Shepard (1923–1998) was the first American astronaut to travel into space.

Alan Shepard is also the name of:
USNS Alan Shepard (T-AKE-3), a U.S. Navy dry cargo ship
Alan Shepard (Halfway Home), a character on the television show Halfway Home
Alan Shepard (academic), American-Canadian academic, president of Western University in London, Ontario, Canada

See also
Alan Shepherd (1935–2007), British motorcycle racer
Alan Sheppard (rugby league) (born 1957), Australian rugby league player 
Allen Sheppard, Baron Sheppard of Didgemere (1932–2015), industrialist